Adam Nathan Campbell Thoseby (born 25 November 1991) is a British-Australian professional basketball player for the Ballarat Miners of the NBL1 South. Born in Melbourne, Victoria, Thoseby grew up in England and began playing for the Reading Rockets in 2009–10 before moving to the United States. He played college basketball between 2011 and 2016 for Utah State, South Dakota and Georgia Southwestern State. He played in the Australian National Basketball League (NBL) for the Sydney Kings in 2017–18 and the British Basketball League (BBL) for the Worcester Wolves in 2018–19. He played in Germany and Austria over the next four years.

Thoseby has represented both the England and Great Britain national basketball teams and is a joint British-Australian passport holder.

Early life and career
Born in Melbourne, Victoria, Thoseby moved to England with his British mother at the age of nine. He grew up in Henley-on-Thames and played junior basketball for the Reading Rockets in nearby Reading.

Thoseby debuted for the Reading Rockets in the English Basketball League (EBL) during the 2009–10 season. He averaged 8.8 points in 19 games.

In 2010, Thoseby moved to United States to attend prep school at Maine Central Institute in Pittsfield, Maine. During the 2010–11 season, he helped the Huskies to a 20–11 record and the New England Preparatory School Athletic Council (NEPSAC) Class AAA title. He averaged 7.3 points, 1.4 rebounds and 1.1 assists per game and scored a season-high 21 points.

College career
In June 2011, Thoseby signed a National Letter of Intent to play college basketball for Utah State.

As a freshman with the Aggies in 2011–12, Thoseby played in 28 of the team's 37 games and made two starts. He averaged 1.6 points in 8.0 minutes per game. He scored a season-high 16 points against Idaho State on 26 November 2011.

In July 2012, Thoseby transferred to South Dakota. He subsequently sat out the 2012–13 season due to NCAA transfer rules.

As a sophomore in 2013–14, Thoseby played in all 30 games for the Coyotes and started the first 11 at small forward. He averaged 7.7 points and 2.3 rebounds in 18 minutes per game. He had 12 double-digit scoring performances including a season-best 16 points against Kansas State on 10 December 2013 and against Omaha on 20 February 2014.

As a junior in 2014–15, Thoseby played in 25 of the Coyotes' 33 games and averaged 2.2 points in 5.7 minutes per game. He scored a then career-high 18 points against Wofford on 22 November 2014.

Thoseby transferred to Georgia Southwestern State of the NCAA Division II in 2015 after graduating from South Dakota with an undergraduate degree in computer science. He led the Hurricanes in scoring at 15.3 points per game, starting all 26 contests in which he appeared in during the 2015–16 season. He scored 20 or more points on seven occasions, including a career-high 34 points against Columbus State on 7 January 2016, and 31 against Francis Marion on 13 February. He was named the Peach Belt Conference (PBC) Player of the Week on 15 February. He was a third-team All-PBC selection and was named to the PBC All-Academic team after holding a 3.67 GPA while majoring in computer science.

Professional career
After attempting to pick up a deal in Europe, Thoseby returned to Australia in 2017 to play in the Big V for the Knox Raiders. In 22 games, he averaged 18.1 points, 3.2 rebounds and 1.4 assists per game. He was subsequently named to the Big V All-Star Five.

On 11 August 2017, Thoseby signed with the Sydney Kings of the Australian National Basketball League (NBL) for the 2017–18 season. He averaged 1.1 points in 18 games for the Kings.

On 22 August 2018, Thoseby signed with the Worcester Wolves of the British Basketball League (BBL) for the 2018–19 season. In 26 games, he averaged 10.8 points, 3.2 rebounds and 1.7 assists per game.

For the 2019 NBL1 season, Thoseby re-joined the Knox Raiders. In 19 games, he averaged 14.4 points, 2.9 rebounds and 1.6 assists per game.

In January 2020, Thoseby moved to Germany to play for Basketball Löwen of the ProB. He quickly became the team's top scorer, averaging of 25.8 points in his first six games. In eight games during the 2019–20 season, he averaged 24.6 points, 4.8 rebounds, 2.3 assists and 1.8 steals per game.

In August 2020, Thoseby signed with Traiskirchen Lions of the Austrian Basketball Superliga for the 2020–21 season. In February 2021, he was ruled out for the rest of the season with partial tears in his Achilles tendon.

In April 2021, Thoseby returned to the Knox Raiders and played three games during the NBL1 South season.

On 1 February 2022, Thoseby signed with the Perry Lakes Hawks of the NBL1 West for the 2022 season. He parted ways with the Hawks on 22 June 2022. In 11 games, he averaged 16.27 points, 2.81 rebounds and 1.72 assists per game.

On 3 February 2023, Thoseby signed with the Ballarat Miners of the NBL1 South.

National team career
As of 2015, Thoseby had represented England or Great Britain in international basketball approximately 40 times. During the summer of 2011, he played for Great Britain's Under 20 basketball team that participated in the European Championships. He averaged 8.9 points per game in the tournament. In 2018, he played for England at the Commonwealth Games on the Gold Coast. He averaged 14.5 points per game in the tournament.

Personal life
Thoseby is the son of Andrew Thoseby and Sue Baker. His mother is British.

Thoseby holds Australian and British citizenship and has both joint British and Australian passports.

References

External links

Utah State Aggies bio
South Dakota Coyotes bio
Georgia Southwestern State Hurricanes profile
Career statistics at daveowenbasketball.co.uk

1991 births
Living people
Australian expatriate basketball people in England
Australian expatriate basketball people in Germany
Australian expatriate basketball people in the United States
Australian men's basketball players
Basketball players from Melbourne
British expatriate basketball people in Australia
British expatriate basketball people in Austria
British expatriate basketball people in Germany
British expatriate basketball people in the United States
British men's basketball players
Georgia Southwestern State University alumni
Maine Central Institute alumni
Shooting guards
Small forwards
South Dakota Coyotes men's basketball players
Sydney Kings players
Traiskirchen Lions players
Utah State Aggies men's basketball players
Worcester Wolves players